The following is a list of rural municipality highways in the Canadian province of Saskatchewan between the numbers 600 and 699.

SK 600 

Highway 600 runs from Highway 18 near Gainsborough to Township Road 174.

Highway 600 intersects Highway 18, Highway 361, Highway 13, Highway 48, Highway 1, Highway 709, Highway 308, and Highway 8.

Highway 600 passes near the towns of Fertile, Antler, Maryfield, Fleming, Welwyn, Rocanville, Spy Hill, and Welby.  Highway 600 is a gravel road that is operational year round.

SK 601 

Highway 601 runs from Highway 1 near Raymore to Township Road 183 near Airsville. Highway 601 connects with Highway 635.

SK 602 

Highway 602 runs from Highway 18 on the north side of Coronach to Highway 18 on the east side of Coronach.

SK 603 

Highway 603 runs from Highway 9 at Elcott to Highway 48 near Wawota. Highway 603 passes near the communities of Auburnton, Manor, and Service. Highway 603 connects with Highways 361 and 13.

SK 604 

Highway 604 runs from the Canada–United States border near North Portal to Highway 13 near Arcola.

SK 605 

Highway 605 runs from Highway 15 east of Melville south to Highway 18 east of Bienfait.

SK 606 

Highway 606 runs from Highway 22 near Abernethy south to Highways 18 and 350 at Torquay. Highway 606 intersects Highways 22, 361, 1, 48, 711, 33, 13, 705, 39, and 18.

Highway 606 passes near the towns of Sintaluta, Montmartre, Fillmore, Griffin, Midale, and Torquay. Access to Mainprize Regional Park on McDonald Lake is also from Highway 606.

SK 607 

Highway 607 runs from Hapree at Highway 705 south to Coronach at Highway 18.

SK 608 

Highway 608 runs from Fir Mountain at Highway 18 south through the Wood Mountain Hills to Killdeer at Highway 18.

SK 609 

Highway 609 runs from the junction of Highways 363 and 721, just south of Hallonquist, south to the junction of Highways 13 and 612, just north of Aneroid.

SK 610 

Highway 610 runs from Highway 18 to Highway 718 near Bateman. Highway 610 also passes near the community of Woodrow. It intersects Highways 13 and 43.

SK 611 

Highway 611 runs from Highway 18 near McCord to Highway 13 near Meyronne.

SK 612 

Highway 612 runs from Highway 1 near Herbert to Township Road 192 near Gouldtown. Highway 612 connects with Highway 645.

SK 613 

Highway 613 runs from Highway 724 south to Highway 18 at Frontier.

SK 614 

Highway 614 runs from Highway 18 near Loomis north to Highway 1 near Piapot through the Cypress Hills. Highway 614 passes near the communities of Eastend, Klintonel, Carnagh, Skull Creek, and Edgell. Highway 614 connects with Highways 13 and 724.

SK 615 

Highway 615 runs from Highway 13 / Highway 21 near Senate to Highway 271. Highway 615 passes near the communities of West Plains, Battle Creek, and Merryflat.

SK 616 

Highway 616 runs from Highway 13 near Forget to Highway 1 near Grenfell.

SK 617 

Highway 617 runs from Highway 22 near Endeavour to Highway 15 near Fairlight.

SK 618 

Highway 618 runs from Highway 10 south to Highway 22.

SK 619 

Highway 619 runs from Highway 48 near Kendal to Highway 10 / Highway 22 near Balcarres. The highway provides access to Katepwa Lake of the Fishing Lakes.

SK 620 

Highway 620 runs from Highway 33 at Sedley to Highway 10 near McLean.

SK 621 

Highway 621 is in two separate segments. The southern segment runs from Highway 13 to Highway 306 near Lewvan, and the northern segment runs from Highway 33 near Lajord to Highway 48.

The southern segment has a  concurrency with Highway 39 near Yellow Grass.

SK 622 

Highway 622 runs from Highway 306 at Riceton, across Highway 33, through Kronau, to the Highway 1 / Highway 46 intersection near Balgonie.

SK 623 

Highway 623 runs from Highway 39 near Rouleau south to Highway 13 at Ogema. The highway runs through the RMs of Key West No. 70 and Elmsthorpe No. 100 and the Piapot 75H Indian reserve. The communities of Ogema and Truax are located along the route. Access to Ogema Regional Park is at the southern terminus of Highway 623, on the southern side of Ogema.

SK 624 

Highway 624 is divided into three sections. The western segment runs from Highway 717 to Highway 715 near Spring Valley. The south-eastern segment runs from Highway 33 near Richardson to Highway 1 at Emerald Park. The north-eastern segment runs from the Highway 46 / Highway 362 intersection at Pilot Butte to Highway 640 at the Muscowpetung 80 Indian reserve.

SK 626 

Highway 626 runs from Highway 1 at Mortlach south to Highway 363 at Old Wives Lake.

SK 627 

Highway 627 runs from Highway 749 south to Highway 43 at Palmer. The highway crosses three major rivers, including the Qu'Appelle River at Eyebrow Lake, Thunder Creek, and Wood River. Major highways it intersects with include the Trans-Canada Highway and Highway 42.

SK 628 

Highway 628 is split into two segments. The southern segment runs from Highway 18 near Glen McPherson to Highway 43 near Pambrun, and the northern segment runs from Highway 1 near Waldeck to Highway 4 near Stewart Valley.

The southern segment passes near the communities of Quimper and Ponteix. It has an intersection with Highway 13. The northern segment passes near the communities of Old Beaver Flat and Beaver Flat.

SK 629 

Highway 629 runs from Highway 16 south to 1 Ave at Atwater.

SK 630 

Highway 630 runs from Highway 343 to Highway 1 near Beverley. Highway 630 passes near the community of Duncairn.

SK 631 

Highway 631 runs from Highway 13 near Scotsguard to Highway 37 near Gull Lake. Highway 631 passes near the community of Simmie.

SK 633 

Highway 633 runs from Highway 13 near South Fork north past Highway 1 to the village of Hazlet.

Along the route, near Highway 13, is Pine Cree Regional Park.

SK 635 

Highway 635 runs from Highway 1 north to Highway 321.

SK 636 

Highway 636 runs from Highway 22 near Gerald north to the Yellowhead Highway between Churchbridge and Langenburg.

SK 637 

Highway 637 runs from Highway 10 near Dunleath to Highway 8 / Highway 49 near Norquay. Highway 637 passes near the communities of Rhein, Dneiper, Veregin, and Fort Pelly. It intersects Highways 309, 726, 5, and 754.

SK 638 

Highway 638 runs from Highway 247 to Highway 9 / Highway 22 near Dubuc.

SK 639 

Highway 639 runs from Highway 15 near Hafford to Highway 39 near Gull Lake. Highway 639 passes near the community of Simmie and through the ghost town of Bryant.

SK 640 

Highway 640 runs from south to north beginning at Highway 364 near Edenwold and ending at Highway 349 in the Rural Municipality of Barrier Valley No. 397 between Archerwill and Naicam. Highway 640 intersects with Highway 16 near Wynyard.

SK 641 

Highway 641 runs from Highway 39 near Rouleau north to Highway 15 at Semans. The highway intersects the Trans-Canada Highway south of Pense and east of Belle Plaine, Highway 20 at Lumsden, and Highway 22 at Earl Grey.

SK 642 

Highway 642 is a runs from Highway 1 near Belle Plaine to Highway 11 near Bethune. Highway 642 also passes near Stony Beach.

SK 643 

Highway 643 runs from Highway 735 to Township Road 243 near Craik. The highway passes near the communities of Caron, Grayburn, Rowletta, and Keeler. It connects with Highways 42 and 732.

SK 644 

Highway 644 runs from Highway 1 near Morse to Highway 42 near Riverhurst. Highway 644 passes near the communities of Glen Kerr and Log Valley.

SK 645 

Highway 645 runs from Highway 612 near Herbert to Range Road 3103 near Old Main Centre and New Main Centre.

SK 646 

Highway 646 runs from the Demaine Access Road near Demaine to Highway 45 near Birsay. Highway 646 connects with Highways 737 and 42. At the intersection with Highway 42 is the community of Lucky Lake.

SK 647 

Highway 647 runs from Highway 342 near Lacadena to Highway 4 near Sanctuary.

SK 648 

Highway 648 runs from Arran at Highways 49 and Highway 660 north to Whitebeech at Highway 753.

SK 649 

Highway 649 runs from Highway 32 near Lemsford to the Highway 21 / Highway 44 junction near Glidden. It crosses the South Saskatchewan River via the Lemsford Ferry.

SK 650 

Highway 650 runs from Highway 753 near Danbury to Highway 9 near Gorlitz. The highway passes near the communities of Hyas, Mikado, Donwell, and Hamton and shares a brief concurrences with Highway 49 near Hyas and with Highway 5 near Mikado.

SK 651 

Highway 651 runs from Highway 52 to Highway 5 near Canora. The highway passes near the communities of Jedburgh, Theodore, and Goldenvale.

SK 653 

Highway 653 runs from the Highway 11 / Highway 44 junction near Davidson north to Highway 15. Highway 747 meets Highway 653 at its southern terminus.

SK 654 

Highway 654 is a former highway. It ran from the Conquest Access Road near Conquest to Highway 45. As of 2005, Range Road 3094 and Township Road 310, the two municipal roads making up Highway 654, are no longer designated as Highway 654.

SK 655 

Highway 655 runs from Highway 15 near Milden to Highway 376. The highway passes near the communities of Feudal, Catherwood, Leney, and Perdue.

SK 656 

Highway 656 runs from Highway 7 at Fiske north to Highway 4 at Cando. The highway passes through the communities of Herschel, Springwater, and Landis. Attractions along the highway include the Ancient Echoes Interpretive Centre at Herschel and Eagle Creek Valley. It shares a concurrency with Highways 31, 51, and 14.

SK 657 

Highway 657 runs from Highway 7 to Highway 51 near Kelfield. The highway shares a concurrency with Highway 31 between Wallisville and Plenty.

SK 658 

SK 659 

Highway 659 runs from Highway 51 to Highway 658. The highway has an intersection with Highway 374 and passes near Broadacres and Tramping Lake.

SK 660 

Highway 660 runs from Highway 8 near St. Philips to Highway 49 near Arran.

SK 661 

Highway 661 runs from the Highway 8 / Highway 49 junction at Pelly to Highway 753.

SK 662 

Highway 662 runs from Highway 49 near Stenen to Highway 753.

SK 663 

Highway 663 runs from Highway 11 near Dundurn north to Highway 16.

SK 664 

Highway 664 runs Highway 5 at Tiny north to Highway 9 / Highway 49 at Sturgis.

SK 665 

Highway 665 runs from Highway 5 at Kylemore north to Highway 49.

SK 667 

Highway 667 runs from Highway 16 near Esk to Highway 5 near St. Gregor. Access to Leroy Leisureland Regional Park is where Highway 667 begins a concurrency with Highway 761.

SK 668 

Highway 668 runs from Highway 365 near Watrous to Highway 16 near Guernsey. The northern  used to be Highway 396 until it was combined into Highway 668. Highway 668 also intersects Highway 761.

SK 669 

Highway 669 runs from Highway 5 to Highway 20.

SK 670 

Highway 670 runs from Highway 2 near Young to Highway 16 near Viscount.

SK 671 

Highway 671 runs from Highway 5 near St. Denis to Highway 41.

SK 672 

Highway 672 runs from Highway 7 near Vanscoy to Highway 16. The goes north from Vanscoy for its first . It then runs concurrently with Highway 14 for  before taking another northbound route. At km 44, Highway 672 begins a 2-km concurrency with Highway 784. After this concurrency, Highway 672 goes north as the Ceepee Grid until its terminus at Highway 16.

SK 673 

Highway 673 runs from Highway 7 near Delisle north to Highway 14 near Asquith.

SK 674 

Highway 674 runs from Highway 40 near Cut Knife to Highway 697. Highways that connect with Highway 674 include Highways 16 and 26. Highway 674 crosses the North Saskatchewan River via the Paynton Ferry. The highway passes near the communities of Paynton and Edam, as well as the Little Pine Band and the Poundmaker Band.

SK 675 

Highway 675 runs from Highway 307 to Highway 798.

SK 676 

Highway 676 runs from Highway 14 south to Highway 51 near Major.

SK 677 

Highway 677 runs from Highway 23 at Carragana north to Highway 3 near Prairie River.

See also 
 List of Saskatchewan municipal roads (700–799)
 List of Saskatchewan provincial highways
 Roads in Saskatchewan

References 

Roads in Saskatchewan